Mix 90.1 FM is a radio station broadcasting in Guyana owned and operated by Trinidadian Company Guardian Media Limited as part of The TBC Radio Network.

Related
 Radio in Guyana

Radio in Guyana